Walter Krüger may refer to:

Walter Krueger (1881–1967), United States Army general  during World War II and military historian
Walter Krüger (architect) (1888–1971), German builder of public monuments, including Tannenberg Memorial
Walter Krüger (SS general) (1890–1945), German SS officer and military commander during World War II
Walter Krüger (Wehrmacht general) (1892–1973), German military commander during World War II; leader of Panzer division
Walter Krüger (athlete) (1930-2018), German track and field athlete

See also
Kruger